Obregon (Spanish: Obregón) is an unincorporated community in Imperial County, California. Obregon was a mining town in the Cargo Muchacho Mountains located near the American Girl Mine. The town was abandoned in 1939, when the mine was closed.

References

Unincorporated communities in Imperial County, California
Unincorporated communities in California